Stellar Group or stellar group may refer to:

Companies
 Stellar Group (construction company), of Jacksonville, Florida
 a sports management company co-founded by Jonathan Barnett

Astronomy
 a grouping of stars
 moving group or stellar group, a group of co-moving stars
 stellar association
 star cluster, a group of gravitationally bound stars
 open cluster 
 galactic cluster
 globular cluster
 super star cluster
 star cloud, a visually defined patch of stars
 asterism (astronomy), a group of stars forming a pattern
 traditional constellation
 multiple star, a set of stars forming a close visual grouping
 star system, a gravitationally bound system of stars